The 1997–98 Duke Blue Devils men's basketball team represented Duke University. The head coach was Mike Krzyzewski. The team played its home games in the Cameron Indoor Stadium in Durham, North Carolina, and was a member of the Atlantic Coast Conference.

Roster

Schedule and results

|-
!colspan=9 style=| Regular Season

|-
!colspan=9 style=| ACC Tournament

|-
!colspan=9 style=| NCAA Tournament

Departing players drafted into the NBA

References

Duke Blue Devils
Duke Blue Devils men's basketball seasons
Duke Blue Devils men's b
Duke Blue Devils men's b
Duke